Traveling Light is a 2022 American drama film written and directed by Bernard Rose and starring Danny Huston, Tony Todd, Stephen Dorff and Olivia d'Abo.

Cast
Tony Todd as Caddy
Danny Huston as Harry
Stephen Dorff as Todd
Matthew Jacobs as Arthur
Olivia d'Abo
Duke Nicholson as Sydney

Release
The film was released on August 19, 2022 in New York City and Seattle.

Reception
The film has a 60% rating on Rotten Tomatoes based on five reviews.

Rene Rodriguez of Variety gave the film a negative review, calling it "an experimental attempt at social commentary that fails to provide any insight, emotion or even entertainment of the most basic kind."

Annie Flores of The Austin Chronicle awarded the film three and a half stars out of five and wrote, "The film successfully evokes all the hair-raising tension of a time not too far behind us, and creates a commentary on class, race, and societal values that continue to resonate nearly three years on."

Bilge Ebiri of Vulture gave the film a positive review and wrote that it "continues Rose’s ongoing efforts to create haunting miniatures about life in Los Angeles with a classical twist."

References

External links
 
 

Films directed by Bernard Rose (director)